No. 3 is a 1997 South Korean gangster comedy film starring Han Suk-kyu as the titular no. 3 man of a gang who's aspiring to rise up the ranks and become the leader of his own gang. It was writer-director Song Nung-han's feature directorial debut.

Themes
In Korean Film: History, Resistance, and Democratic Imagination, Min Eung-jun et al. state that through his portrayal of gangster society in this film, Song allegorically criticizes all of contemporary South Korean society. Calling the film a "black comedy employing satire and self-reflexivity", Min says the film represents a revisionist impulse in contemporary Korean cinema for several reasons. It uses violence allegorically not as an expression of repressed sexuality, but as an expression of the absurdity of Korean society. Also, rather than focus exclusively on male aspirations, it simultaneously shows the desires of its female characters as well. Furthermore, in satirizing Korean society, it does not exclude the bourgeoisie from its critical eye.

Rather than employ the straightforward narrative techniques and "ruthless logic" of the traditional gangster film such as director Im Kwon-taek's General's Son trilogy, No. 3 uses a purposely artificial and stylized technique to satirize both the gangster genre and society at large. Like Green Fish, released the same year, and other "new" gangster films, No. 3 refuses to deal with a story built around the traditional Korean concept of han, a concept which Min calls "endurance and acceptance of painful life within the community". No. 3 replaces han with "new values" such as materialism and individualism, which are then held up for ridicule.

Min singles out the last segment of the film, "Chaos", for analysis, calling it one of the major achievements of the new Korean cinema. In this part of the film, the Korean gang boss has invited his Japanese gangster associates for a meeting in a room salon. While the meeting is in progress, the wife of the Korean boss is having sex with her poetry tutor in another room. An argument over the ownership of the Liancourt Islands breaks out between the lower strata of Japanese and Korean gangsters just as a rival gang breaks in to assassinate the Korean boss. Police then show up to arrest the entire group. Min says that this kaleidoscopic portrayal of the chaos of contemporary society "portrays in a tongue-in-cheek manner the anarchic blending of gangland with business, loyalty... with infidelity, sex with poetry, and violence with nationalism".

Cast
Han Suk-kyu - Tae-ju
Choi Min-sik - Dong-pal
Lee Mi-yeon - Hyun-ji
Park Kwang-jung - Rimbaud
Park Sang-myun - Ashtray
Song Kang-ho - Jo-pil
Bang Eun-hee - Ji-na

See also 
 Cinema of South Korea
 Kkangpae

References

External links

1997 films
1990s crime comedy films
South Korean crime comedy films
South Korean gangster films
1990s Korean-language films
1997 directorial debut films
1997 comedy films